Aquayamycin is an anthraquinone derivative.
It is an inhibitor of the enzyme tyrosine hydroxylase.

Saquayamycins (saquayamycins A, B, C and D) are antibiotics of the aquayamycin group found in Streptomyces nodosus cultures broth.

References 

Anthraquinone glycosides
Tyrosine hydroxylase inhibitors
Triketones
Angucyclines